{{DISPLAYTITLE:C9H9NO5}}
The molecular formula C9H9NO5 (molar mass: 211.17 g/mol) may refer to:

 DIMBOA, or 2,4-dihydroxy-7-methoxy-1,4-benzoxazin-3-one
 Nitroapocynin
 Topaquinone (TPQ)

Molecular formulas